Francis George Finley (27 February 1882 - c. 1943) was a rugby union player who represented Australia.

Finley, a scrum-half, was born in Armidale, New South Wales and claimed one international rugby caps for Australia, playing against Great Britain, at Sydney, on 30 July 1904.

References

Australian rugby union players
Australia international rugby union players
1882 births
Year of death missing
Rugby union players from Armidale, New South Wales
Rugby union scrum-halves